Rafael Santiago Casal (born August 8, 1985) is an American writer, rapper, actor, producer, director, and show runner originally from the San Francisco Bay Area. He is also an online creator of music, poetry, web shorts, and political commentary.

Early life
Casal grew up in Berkeley and Oakland, California. He was expelled from Berkeley High School after two years and earned his diploma through an alternative independent study program. Casal is of Irish, Spanish, and Cuban descent.

Career

Poetry 
When he was 18, Casal appeared on HBO's Def Poetry Jam. At the same time, he was touring, performing, and teaching nationwide with YouthSpeaks. He is a two time Brave New Voice Poetry Slam Festival champion. Casal spent three years serving as creative director at the University of Wisconsin-Madison's First Wave Spoken Word and Hip Hop Arts Learning Community while earning his degree at night.

Music 
In July 2010, Casal released The BAY BOY Mixtape with Daveed Diggs under the Getback Productions crew the pair co-founded with Chinaka Hodge. Casal has also released several solo mixtapes online: As Good As Your Word (2008), Monster (2009) and Mean Ones (2012).  In 2018, Casal and Diggs released the Collin and Miles EPs to accompany their film Blindspotting.

Film and television
In 2018, Casal and best friend Daveed Diggs released their movie, Blindspotting. The pair wrote, produced, and starred in the film, which uses verse to tell the story of the town of Oakland, California. Casal has also appeared in small supporting roles in Bad Education, The Good Lord Bird, and the second revival of Are You Afraid of the Dark? Recently, Casal made a brief appearance in the Netflix documentary series, Amend: The Fight for America.

In 2020, it was confirmed that Blindspotting would be adapted as a comedy-drama series of the same name, with Casal serving as co-writer, director, executive producer, and showrunner, as well as reprising his role as Miles. The series was picked up by Lionsgate Television and had its world premiere at the Tribeca Film Festival on June 11, 2021. It became available for streaming on June 13, 2021 on Starz and StarzPlay. In October 2021, it was announced that Starz had renewed the series for a second season. It is set to premiere at SXSW in March 2023 and will air on Starz on April 14, 2023.

Filmography

References

21st-century American male actors
American people of Cuban descent
Berkeley High School (Berkeley, California) alumni
Living people
Male actors from the San Francisco Bay Area
Male actors from Berkeley, California
Male actors from Oakland, California
Musicians from Oakland, California
People from Berkeley, California
Rappers from the San Francisco Bay Area
American spoken word poets
American male poets
1985 births
Hispanic and Latino American actors